VTV4 is a Vietnamese state-owned pay television network, serving as the international broadcaster of Vietnam Television. Launched on 7 January 1998, it offers a best-of package of programming from the three domestic channels (VTV1, VTV2 and VTV3) to the Vietnamese diaspora worldwide.
From March 31, 2018, Vietnam Television stopped broadcasting foreign satellite channels on VTV4. Specifically, Vietnam Television will stop broadcasting via satellites Thaicom5 (Asia and North Africa), Eutelsat Hot Bird 13B (European region), Hispasat 30W-5 (South America region), Galaxy 19 (regional region). North America region). After satellite coverage is discontinued, viewers who are using satellite receivers and dish antennas in the above regions will not be able to watch this channel with the old method.

Instead, overseas Vietnamese can easily watch TV via VTVGo - the official online TV viewing application of Vietnam Television Station.

In addition, TV viewers in general as well as overseas Vietnamese in particular can watch all channels from VTV1 to VTV9 online and watch missed programs on VTV News (address: https://vtv.vn) or on VTV News app easily and conveniently.

Broadcast hours
NOTES: All times are in UTC+07:00.
 January 1995 – 3 February 1998: 21:45 to 22:45 (1/24h)
 March 1998 – 2001: 00:00 to 04:00 (4/24h)
Before 1 November 2004: 00:00 to 08:00 (official programs); 08:00 to 24:00 (reruns) (24/24h)
1 November 2004 – present: 24 hours per day

References

List of television programmes broadcast by Vietnam Television (VTV)

Vietnam Television
Television channels and stations established in 1998
Television networks in Vietnam
International broadcasters